C/2006 M4 is one of several SWAN comets; the others are C/2002 O6, C/2004 H6, C/2004 V13, C/2005 P3, P/2005 T4, C/2009 F6, C/2011 Q4 and C/2012 E2.

Comet C/2006 M4 (SWAN) is a non-periodic comet discovered in late June 2006 by Robert D. Matson of Irvine, California and Michael Mattiazzo of Adelaide, South Australia in publicly available images of the Solar and Heliospheric Observatory (SOHO). These images were captured by the Solar Wind ANisotropies (SWAN) Lyman-alpha all-sky camera on board the SOHO. The comet was officially announced after a ground-based confirmation by Robert McNaught (Siding Spring Survey) on July 12.

Although perihelion was Sept 28, 2006, the comet flared dramatically from seventh magnitude to fourth magnitude on October 24, 2006, becoming visible with the naked eye.

Comet C/2006 M4 is in a hyperbolic trajectory (with an osculating eccentricity larger than 1) during its passage through the inner Solar System. After leaving the influence of the planets, the eccentricity will drop below 1 and it will remain bound to the Solar System as an Oort cloud comet.

Given the extreme orbital eccentricity of this object, different epochs can generate quite different heliocentric unperturbed two-body best-fit solutions to the aphelion distance (maximum distance) of this object. For objects at such high eccentricity, the Suns barycentric coordinates are more stable than heliocentric coordinates. Using JPL Horizons, the barycentric orbital elements for epoch 2013-May-14 generate a semi-major axis of about 1300 AU and a period of about 47,000 years.

References

External links 
 Orbital simulation from JPL (Java) / Horizons Ephemeris
 C/2006 M4 ( SWAN ) @ Seiichi Yoshida (September 21, 2007)
 C/2006 M4 (SWAN) @ Gary W. Kronk's Cometography

Non-periodic comets
20060620